Barefoot Empress is an Indo-American short documentary film directed by Vikas Khanna. The film depicts the life story of a woman in India who enrolls in first grade at the age of 96. The film is co-produced by Oscar nominated Doug Roland and Dr. Deepak Chopra serves as an executive producer.

Summary 
Barefoot Empress, a 15 minute short film revolves around the remarkable journey of Karthyayani Amma, who, having never had access to education as a girl, finally gets a chance at education. At 96-years-old she was the oldest among the 43,330 candidates who appeared for the 'Aksharalaksham' test, a fourth standard equivalent examination. Karthyayani Amma surprised the entire country by topping a literacy examination conducted by the Kerala government, scoring a stellar 98 out of 100. The state-run Kerala State Literacy Mission Authority (KSLMA) has certified that her score is a record.Karthyayani Amma, who hails from Haripad in Alappuzha district, doesn’t plan on stopping anytime soon. She plans to complete her Class 10 equivalent by the time she turns 100. Her inspirational story is what led her to becoming a Commonwealth of Learning Goodwill Ambassador in 2019. She was also awarded the Nari Shakti Puraskar by President of India, Ram Nath Kovind on Women’s Day in March 2020.
Her inspirational story is proof that it’s never too late to realize your dreams.

Production history 
Karthyayani Amma's story caught director Vikas Khanna's attention via a tweet in 2018. Hearing the first hand account of her life inspired the making of Barefoot Empress.With Amma as an inspiration, Khanna has partnered with non-profit organisation Leap to Shine for rehabilitating classrooms, providing basic educational supplies, improving nutrition of girls by providing health meals and training them in culinary skills to be financially independent.For Khanna and his team, Barefoot Empress has now become a movement to bring five million girls back to school over a period of three years.

Accolades

References

External links 

 

2020s Malayalam-language films
2021 films